A proletarian revolution or proletariat revolution is a social revolution in which the working class attempts to overthrow the bourgeoisie and change the previous political system. Proletarian revolutions are generally advocated by socialists, communists and anarchists.

The concept of a revolutionary proletariat was first put forward by the French revolutionary socialist and radical Auguste Blanqui. Marxists believe proletarian revolutions can and will likely happen in all capitalist countries, related to the concept of world revolution.

Interpretations

The Leninist branch of Marxism argues that a proletarian revolution must be led by a vanguard of "professional revolutionaries", men and women who are fully dedicated to the communist cause and who form the nucleus of the communist revolutionary movement. This vanguard is meant to provide leadership and organization to the working class before and during the revolution, which aims to prevent the government from successfully ending it. Vladimir Lenin believed that it was imperative to arm the working class to secure their leverage over the bourgeoisie. Lenin's words were printed in an article in German on the nature of pacifism and said "In every class society, whether based on slavery, serfdom, or, as at present, on wage-labour, the oppressor class is always armed." It was under such conditions that the first proletarian revolution, the Russian revolution, occurred.

Other Marxists, such as Luxemburgists, disagree with the Leninist idea of a vanguard and insist that the entire working class—or at least a large part of it—must be deeply involved and equally committed to the socialist or communist cause for a proletarian revolution to be successful. To this end, they seek to build mass working class movements with a very large membership.

Finally, there are socialist anarchists and libertarian socialists. Their view is that the revolution must be a bottom-up social revolution which seeks to transform all aspects of society and the individuals which make up the society (see Asturian Revolution and Revolutionary Catalonia). Alexander Berkman said "there are revolutions and revolutions. Some revolutions change only the governmental form by putting a new set of rulers in place of the old. These are political revolutions, and as such they often meet with little resistance. But a revolution that aims to abolish the entire system of wage slavery must also do away with the power of one class to oppress another. That is, it is not any more a mere change of rulers, of government, not a political revolution, but one that seeks to alter the whole character of society. That would be a social revolution."

See also 

 Communist revolution
 Free association of producers, the ultimate goal of communist and anarchist revolutions
 Labour revolt
 October Revolution
 Asturian miners' strike of 1934
 Revolution of 1934
 Proletarian Revolutionary Organisation, Nepal
 Social revolution
 World revolution

References 

Marxist terminology
Revolution terminology
Revolutions by type
Socialism
Working-class culture
Proletariat